Barry Morris Goldwater Jr. (born July 15, 1938) is an American businessman and politician. He is a former Republican member of the United States House of Representatives from California, serving from 1969 to 1983. He is the son of U.S. Senator and 1964 Republican presidential nominee Barry Goldwater.

Early life
Goldwater was born in Los Angeles, California, on July 15, 1938, the son of Barry M. Goldwater and his wife Margaret Johnson.  He graduated from Staunton Military Academy in Staunton, Virginia, in 1957. Goldwater attended the University of Colorado, and graduated from Arizona State University in 1962. He then worked as a stockbroker, public relations executive, and in import-export business, before being elected to Congress.

In 1972, he married Susan Lee Gherman, daughter of Dr. E. Mortimer and Irene Gherman of Newport Beach, California.  They had a son, Barry M. Goldwater, III.  The couple divorced in May 1979.

Political career

In office

When Edwin Reinecke resigned from Congress in January 1969 to become lieutenant governor of California, this opened up California's 27th district which at the time covered parts of northern Los Angeles County. In the following special election, Goldwater was selected as the Republican nominee, and John Van de Kamp was selected by the Democrats. Goldwater won 57% to 43%, serving for the remainder of the 91st Congress, and was reelected twice. He was redistricted to the 20th district ahead of the 1974 election, and was elected to another four terms in that district.

During his time in Washington, Goldwater served on several committees, such as the Committee on Public Works and Transportation, the Joint Committee on Energy, and the Committee on Science and Technology. He drafted a number of bills while serving in the House, most notably the Privacy Act of 1974, which prevents the distribution of private information from government and businesses.

With his district merged with that of Bobbi Fiedler due to redistricting, Goldwater retired from the House to run for the Republican nomination to the Senate in 1982. He lost that race to San Diego mayor and future Governor Pete Wilson, who would go on to win the general election.

Advocacy
In the 1980 presidential election, Goldwater campaigned for Ronald Reagan, a family friend, who won the election against Jimmy Carter. Ahead of the 2003 recall election to replace Gray Davis as Governor of California, he supported Arnold Schwarzenegger, and had a public debate with President Reagan's son Ron Reagan.

On November 16, 2007, Goldwater endorsed Republican presidential candidate Ron Paul of Texas for the GOP nomination in 2008. On January 5, 2008, Goldwater announced his decision to go to New Hampshire to campaign for Ron Paul, after Paul's 10% showing in the Iowa caucuses, held on January 3, 2008. Paul would garner 8% of the vote in New Hampshire. He also spoke in support of Ron Paul at the Kansas GOP caucus.

On September 4, 2008, a list of electors in Louisiana using the label "Louisiana Taxpayers Party" paid $500 and filed papers with the Secretary of State's Office to get on the ballot. They were pledged to Ron Paul for president, and to Goldwater for vice president. The ticket received 9,368 votes in Louisiana, coming in third place in the popular vote.

In 2015, Goldwater was chairman of TUSK – Tell Utilities Solar won't be Killed – "that aims at pushing solar from a different perspective: a Republican one". The group favored net metering. In the same policy area, the Goldwater Institute "sued to have [Arizona]'s renewable energy standards and tariffs throw[n] out in a move that would have slowed solar development to a crawl", per ''Phoenix Business Journal.

Business career

After retiring from politics, Goldwater moved to Los Angeles and pursued a career in the financial sector, specializing in security law and underwriting. His clients were major U.S. banks and insurance companies. Goldwater became a member of the New York Stock Exchange, and a partner in what is now Wedbush Securities (formerly Noble Cook, Inc.)

Goldwater lives in Phoenix, Arizona, near his son Barry M. Goldwater III.

He has served on the board of the Barry M. Goldwater Scholarship and Excellence in Education Program. As of October 2018, he serves on the board of directors of the Goldwater Institute. The Goldwater Institute is a non-profit political think tank which studies and publishes findings on public policies that align with the conservative values promoted by Goldwater's father. Goldwater generally supported legislation and policies that embrace economic independence, individual rights, and limited government.

Goldwater maintains his contact with Republican and Democratic leaders, as well as celebrity activists, and is still active in the conservative political movement. He is a member of the American Numismatic Association, and is currently director of the National Collector's Mint.

Awards and honors
Goldwater has won several awards, including the Achievement Award from the National Academy of Television Arts & Sciences, an award from the President's Commission on Employment of the Handicapped, the Distinguished Service Award of the A.C.A., and the Conscience of the Congress Award of the American Conservative Union.

References

External links
 Barry Goldwater Jr. official website
 Congressional biography
 
 HBO Interview in Mr. Conservative
 Goldwater Institute
 Barry M. Goldwater Scholarship and Excellence in Education Program

1938 births
Living people
American people of English-Jewish descent
American people of Polish-Jewish descent
American stockbrokers
Arizona Republicans
Arizona State University alumni
Barry Goldwater
Jewish members of the United States House of Representatives
Politicians from Los Angeles
Politicians from Phoenix, Arizona
Republican Party members of the United States House of Representatives from California
Staunton Military Academy alumni
University of Colorado Boulder alumni